Pinkney may refer to:

People

Surname 
Alan Pinkney (born 1947), English footballer
Andrea Davis Pinkney (born 1963), American children's author
Bill Pinkney (1925–2007), American performer and singer, member of The Drifters
Bob Pinkney (born 1934), Canadian football player
Charles Cotesworth Pinckney (born 1746), early American statesman of South Carolina, Revolutionary War veteran, and delegate to the Constitutional Convention
Cleveland Pinkney (born 1977), American football player
Colleen Pinkney (born 1957), Canadian curler
David H. Pinkney (1914–1993), American historian
David Pinkney (born 1952), English racing driver
Dwight Pinkney (born 1945), Jamaican guitarist
Edward Coote Pinkney (1802–1828), minor American poet
Edward Pinkney, American founder of Black Autonomy Network Community Organization
Ernie Pinkney, Scottish footballer
Fayette Pinkney (1948–2009), American singer
George Pinkney (1859–1926), American baseball player
Isiah Pinkney (born 1968), American rapper 12 Gauge
Jared Pinkney (born 1997), American football player
Jerry Pinkney (born 1939), American book illustrator
Kevinn Pinkney (born 1983), American basketball player
Larry Pinkney, African-American activist
Lovell Pinkney (born 1972), American football player
Miles Pinkney (1599–1674), English Catholic priest
Nick Pinkney (born 1970), English rugby league player
Ninian Pinkney (1811–1877), U.S. Navy medical director, active during the American Civil War
Peter Pinkney (born 1956), British trade unionist
Reggie Pinkney (born 1955), American football player
Ron Pinkney (born 1935), American broadcaster
Rose Catherine Pinkney (born 1964), American television executive
Thomas Pinckney (born 1750), early American statesman, diplomat, and soldier in both the American Revolutionary War and the War of 1812, achieving the rank of major general
Tony Pinkney (born 1956), English teacher and literary writer
William Pinkney (1764–1822), American statesman and diplomat
The Monroe-Pinkney Treaty between the United States and the United Kingdom was drawn up by William Pinkney and James Monroe (but rejected by the U.S. government)
William Pinkney (bishop) (1810–1883), Bishop of Maryland, USA

Given name 
Pinkney H. Walker (1815–1885), American jurist
Pinkney L. Near (1927–1990), American museum curator
Pinkney Lugenbeel (1819–1886), American army officer
Pinkney "Pink" Anderson (1900–1974), American blues singer and guitarist

Places 
Pinkney, Wiltshire, a hamlet in England
Pinkney and Gerrick Woods, a biological site in Cleveland, England
Pinkney City or Pinkneyville, a community in Stevens County, Washington, USA

Other uses
Dave Pinkney Trophy, an award in the Ontario Hockey League
USS Pinkney (APH-2), a WW2 evacuation transport

See also
Pinckney (disambiguation)
Pinkneys Green, a village in Berkshire, England
Pinkney's Point, a community in Nova Scotia, Canada
Pinkneyville, New Jersey, an unincorporated community